1992 World Ice Hockey Championships may refer to:
 1992 Men's World Ice Hockey Championships
 1992 IIHF Women's World Championship
 1992 World Junior Ice Hockey Championships